This is a list of Turkish football transfers for the 2020–21 winter transfer window by club. Only transfers of clubs in the Süper Lig are included.

The winter transfer window opened on 1 January 2021, although a few transfers took place prior to that date. The window closed at midnight on 2 February 2021. Players without a club may join one at any time, either during or in between transfer windows.

Süper Lig

Alanyaspor

In:

Out:

Ankaragücü

In:

Out:

Antalyaspor

In:

Out:

Beşiktaş

In:

Out:

BB Erzurumspor

In:

Out:

Çaykur Rizespor

In:

Out:

Denizlispor

In:

Out:

Fatih Karagümrük

In:

Out:

Fenerbahçe

In:

Out:

Galatasaray

In:

Out:

Gaziantep

In:

Out:

Gençlerbirliği

In:

Out:

Göztepe

In:

Out:

Hatayspor

In:

Out:

İstanbul Başakşehir

In:

Out:

Kasımpaşa

In:

Out:

Kayserispor

In:

Out:

Konyaspor

In:

Out:

Sivasspor

In:

Out:

Trabzonspor

In:

Out:

Yeni Malatyaspor

In:

Out:

References

Transfers
Turkey
2020–21